This is a list of public artworks in Philadelphia.  The Association for Public Art estimates the city has thousands of public artworks; the Smithsonian lists more than 700.  Since 1959 nearly 400 works of public art have been created as part of the city's Percent for Art program, the first such program in the U.S.

This list contains only works of public art in outdoor public spaces, and not, for example, works inside museums.  Most of the works mentioned are sculptures. Other kinds of art, i.e., sound installations, are marked as such next to their titles.

Artworks

Center City and Benjamin Franklin Parkway

Fairmount Park and Schuylkill River
Including Philadelphia Museum of Art, East Fairmount Park, Laurel Hill Cemetery, West Fairmount Park, and Philadelphia Zoo.

North and Northeast Philadelphia

Northwest Philadelphia

South Philadelphia

West and Southwest Philadelphia

Unclassified (so far)

References

External links

Public art
Philadelphia
 
Art
Public art in Pennsylvania